The 50,000 Colombian peso note is the second highest denomination of Colombian currency. Designed by Óscar Muñoz, the front of the notes feature Jorge Isaacs and the heroine of his novel María, and the back of the notes feature an Albizia saman tree, two palm trees, an image of Isaacs' house El Paraiso, and an excerpt from María. In June 2013, the Bank of the Republic of Colombia estimated that 602,500,000 notes of the 50,000 denomination were in circulation.

It was first printed on 1 December 2000, and contains many safety features such as a watermark, ultra-violet ink, a holographic strip, and microprinting. Measuring , each note is made of cotton fibre.

History
Until 1870, there were no banks in Colombia; credit was only available through the Church and major traders. Coins made of gold, silver, nickel and copper were in circulation but no notes were issued, given the underdeveloped monetary system of Colombia. The Banco de Bogotá was the first private bank to be established in Colombia, in 1870. From 1871 to 1886, thirty-six private banks issued notes under Act 35. However, in 1886, President Rafael Núñez declared notes produced by Banco Nacional as Colombia's legal tender.

After its creation in 1923, the Bank of the Republic was established as Colombia's main bank, and the only one permitted to issue currency. Between 1923 and 1931, denominations of 1, 2, 5, 10, 20, 50, 100 and 500 peso notes were put into circulation, which were able to be exchanged for gold or United States dollars. After the 1930s, these notes ceased to be convertible into gold but remained in circulation until the mid 1970s, when they were replaced by copper and nickel coins. These coins were manufactured until 1991 by the General Treasury of the Nation.

Graphics
The printing of the notes of the Bank of the Republic of Colombia was officially inaugurated on 23 October 1959, and the 50,000 peso note was first printed in 2000. The 50,000 peso note is the highest denomination of currency in Colombia, and measures 140mm by 70mm. The illustrations are presented vertically, and the note was designed by Óscar Muñoz.

On the front side of the note, the main colours are purple, green and yellow, and it features an image of writer and poet Jorge Isaacs, with a background of the Cauca River in Valle del Cauca. The heroine of his novel María is also shown, an image which was inspired a monument by Luis A. Parera. "50" is written in Braille. Also on the front of the note is the name of the currency (peso), the country (Colombia), and the name of the Bank of the Republic.

The reverse of the note features an Albizia saman tree, which is characteristic to the region of Valle del Cauca, and also an image of Isaacs' house El Paraiso, which he purchased in 1854 and resided in during his adolescence. This side is predominantly purple and yellow, and also contains the logo of the Bank of the Republic. Two palm trees are also printed on the reverse, and behind them is a paragraph from María about the evening atmosphere in Valle del Cauca:

Editions

Since the initial printing of the 50,000 peso note, there have been nineteen editions of it:

Safety features
The notes have two security threads, the first being an opaque band, and the second being the text "50 MIL PESOS COLOMBIA" which can be seen under direct light. There is a watermark of Jorge Isaacs' face, along with many examples of relief printing. Under ultraviolet light, the note appears to be orange with yellow fibrils. It is also protected by a serial number, and various microprinting and colour-shifting ink is used on the front for the number 50 (which the colour-shifting ink causes to change from a golden to green colour when tilted). On both sides of the note, there are books shown on the notes with blank areas of colour. When the note is viewed by transparency, these areas coincide with the ones on the other side of the note.

Production
As of March 2010, the production cost of each 50,000 peso note is 103 pesos. In comparison, a 1,000 peso note costs 57 pesos to produce, given that it does not have as many safety devices. Notes in poor condition are sent to the Central Treasury, where they are destroyed. The manufacturing process of each note takes 28 days, and each note will stay in circulation for 34 months. Despite other countries adopting laminated notes for greater durability, Colombia has decided not to in order to attempt to prevent counterfeit notes.

References

Economy of Colombia
Peso
Currencies introduced in 2000
Fifty-thousand-base-unit banknotes